The Bread of Those Early Years is a 1962 West German film directed by Herbert Vesely, based on the novel The Bread of Those Early Years by Heinrich Böll. It was entered into the 1962 Cannes Film Festival.

Cast
 Christian Doermer as Walter Fendrich
  as Gertrud
 Vera Tschechowa as Ulla Wickweber
 Eike Siegel as Frau Brotig
 Gerry Bretscher as Wolf Wickweber
 Tilo von Berlepsch as Vater Fendrich

References

External links

1962 films
1962 drama films
West German films
Films set in Berlin
German drama films
1960s German-language films
German black-and-white films
Films based on German novels
Films based on works by Heinrich Böll
Films directed by Herbert Vesely
1960s German films